Solomon Islands competed at the 2015 Pacific Games in Port Moresby, Papua New Guinea from 4 to 18 July 2015. The Solomon Islands listed 287 competitors as of 4 July 2015.

Athletics

Solomon Islands qualified nineteen athletes in track and field:

Men
 Alfred Iiisia
 Rubinson Kenedy
 Henry Mabe
 Freda Mama
 Alwin Muha
 Moses Ohaiihi
 Kevin Pio
 Rosefelo Siosi
 Mathew Sukulu
 Emmanuel Maefigo Tautaumae
 Chris Votu

Women
 Hilda Alavani
 Sharon Kikini Firisua
 Dianah Matekali

Parasport
Men
 Naka Kobariki

Women
 Diana Ma'ahoro
 Hellen Glenda Saohaga

Basketball

Solomon Islands qualified men's and women's basketball teams (total of 29 players):

Men
 Augustine Namona Basia
 Arthur Makia Boardman
 Matthew Nicholas Boardman
 Brian David Kelesimfo Fatai
 Hilton Maetarau Gwali
 David Moses Kivo
 Moulton Matthew Maefilia
 Timmy Toata Magi
 Alex Chester Masaea
 Walton Ngibutai Panio
 Philip Tuhaika
 Waige Turueke
 Nigel Simeon Tutuo
 Allan Junior Wanefai

Women
 Joycelyn Aunga Basia
 Miriam Lingia Basia
 Mary Daffie
 Elsie Gwen Daiwo
 Rose Gwali
 Rowse Maea Lee
 Esther Teatanga Lii
 Leanne Lema Maetoloa
 Nisha Pongi Meneses
 Tessa Nori
 Delmah Niuhigo Peseika
 Nicola Nikki Ann Pongi
 Maya Tepua Van Den Heever
 Nefertiti Teusi Van Den Heever
 Lysa Orodo Wini

Beach volleyball

Solomon Islands qualified five athletes in beach volleyball:

Men
 Benny Kefu
 James David Waneasi

Women
 Glency Eddie
 Sussie Teota Teno

Bodybuilding

Solomon Islands qualified eight athletes in bodybuilding:

Men
 Allan Atai
 Leslie Ruraimanu Faarodo
 Gordon Laiseniasaenile
 Peter Molemae
 Dennis Dolaga Sala
 Rocky Teklem
 David Dan Tom
 Banabas Waga

Boxing

Solomon Islands qualified six athletes in boxing:

Men
 Gardiel Kumata Gabuvai
 Paul Kava
 Francis Mano Milamila
 Redley Opa
 Alfie Junior Maungatuu Pongi Lai
 Holyfield Riga

Field hockey

Solomon Islands qualified a men's hockey fives team (9 players):

Men
 Nixon Buga
 Eric Faasuia
 Gherzon Hesi
 Hicks Livingstone
 Gary Edward Nuopula
 Arthur Peloko
 Francis Sade
 Allen Temoa
 Floyd Vekebola

Football

Solomon Islands qualified men's and women's football teams (total of 50 players):

Men
 Sandy Tahiri Aniholland
 Timothy Bakale
 Fred Bala
 Margaret Kala Belo
 Natanela Mosese Bero
 Fred Farui Buai
 Simon Daoi
 Fredrick Anita Dola
 James Dooro
 Atana Fa'arodo|Atana Junior Faarodo
 Matson Fenny
 Frank Foli
 Merina Philip Joe
 Obed Kevin
 George Ladoga
 Timothy Maearasia
 Harrison Mala
 Philip Mango
 Dickson Mouli
 Keso Hendry Nelson
 Allen Peter
 Boni Pride
 Jimmy Raramane
 John Rofeta
 Jared Bently Maela Rongosulia
 Misitana Samani
 Anthony Furai Talo
 Tuti Zama Tanito
 Davidson Tome
 Alex Allen Waimora

Women
 Cathy Aihunu
 Crystal Annie Bakolo
 Annie Geli
 Elsie Kwoaetolo
 Elizabeth Betty Malau
 Jessica Rose Mana
 Brenda Birisi Masae
 Ella Misibini
 Agnes Noisi
 Hazelyn Nunu
 Janise Desie Onika
 Caroline Otainao
 Rose Junior Titi Paia
 Alice Patrick
 Betty Sade
 Layda Anitae Samani
 Liza Solo
 Roselyn Takaramu
 Elizabeth Teiasi
 Veronica Tolivaka

Golf

Solomon Islands qualified twelve athletes in golf:

Men
 Alick Dalo
 James Faeni
 Ben Felani
 Tonny Ramo
 George Albert Rukabo
 Wesley Talaka Sifaka

Women
 Sitina Luisa Balekana
 Everlyn Maelasi
 Ravatu Tabe
 Rosita Teofilo
 Ronica Dima Tyson
 Norma Jans Wopereis

Karate

Solomon Islands qualified six athletes in karate:

Men
 Robert Gregory Anita
 Frengy Bisoka
 Selwyn Kuru
 Ashley John Marigeni
 Harry Kima Marigeni

Women
 Janet Lydia Gwai

Netball

Solomon Islands qualified a netball team (14 players):

Women
 Helen Kathleen Aumae
 Rebby Namoi Basia
 Muriel Dagi
 Margaret Garo
 Monica Hanahunu
 Jessica Qilavuru Lapo
 Ethel Leamana
 Judith Harriet Mamuli
 Roina Oke
 Miriam Poloso
 Nadine Rakeiforau
 Merry Arifu Taloga
 Shalom Akao Waita
 Nimah Harkness Wilmot

Powerlifting

Solomon Islands qualified four athletes in powerlifting:

Men
 Watson Hou
 Rocky Manisui Ramo
 Milton Belo Sade

Women
 Vicky Maomaiasi

Rugby league nines

Solomon Islands qualified a men's rugby league nines team (22 players):

Men
 Bruce Angikimua
 Zanetana Dragomir Djokovic
 Maitoo Aohana Hauirae
 Atson Hudy Hou
 Elwin Tangimatai John
 Mostyn Maenuu (Jnr)
 Ezekiel Wale Mana
 Jeffery Maungatuu
 Steve Tepuke Moana
 Jimmy Kauga Puia
 Timo Ngatonga Sanga
 Moses Moetai Singamoana
 Rodney Sinugeba
 Tuimaugi Steve Kauga
 Lavan Taika
 Duran Tomasi Taupongi
 Eugene Tepai Tekobi
 Carlwyn Tengemoana
 Tingiia Tino
 Billy Junior Toatee
 Lavern Tuhatangata
 Utu Junior Willy

Rugby sevens

Solomon Islands qualified a men's rugby sevens team (14 players):

Men
 John Bakila
 Jonathan Maitaki Kaituu
 Ephrem Baptiste Kelesi
 Mariano Lewis Buzzo Kelesi
 Viv Frank Kelesi
 Sakus Maelasi
 Jonny Tapuika Maui
 Steven Momoa
 Frank Tautai Paikea
 Leslie Ngiumoana Puia
 Solly Giungataa Seuika
 Roger Tepai
 Roman Pautangata Tongaka
 Shane Yee

Sailing

Solomon Islands qualified five athletes in sailing:

Men
 Charles Baragamu
 Joe Beliga
 Clyde Jedzini
 Olson Pancrasio Tome Sikwaae
 Steven Wako

Swimming

Solomon Islands qualified six athletes in swimming:

Men
 Jobest Koohioa Dan
 Albert Kado
 Clayment Bill Lafiara

Women
 Eva Gali
 Rose Tadoe
 Justine Qiroqiro Taenaferu

Table tennis

Solomon Islands qualified one athlete in table tennis:

Men
 Rob Dorovolomo

Taekwondo

Solomon Islands qualified 10 athletes in taekwondo:

Men
 Delly Alick
 Davis Goni
 Herick Henry
 Isaac Pat Myrie
 Winston Clody Poko
 Nelson Ramoi
 Clyde Sade Rika
 David George Sulumae
 Patrick Tom

Women
 Emily Magaret Kwoaetolo

Tennis

Solomon Islands qualified eight athletes in tennis:

Men
 Charlie Junior Junior Benjamin
 Christinnoh Fujiyama
 Graham Junior Mani
 Luke Paeni
 Lam Selwyn

Women
 Irene Mahnke
 Geojimah Sauramoniabu Row
 Vinda Sylvia None Teally

Touch rugby

Solomon Islands qualified a men's touch rugby team (13 players):

Men
4th – Men's tournament
 Harry Bangesunga Atikake
 Laurenson Taga Ilala
 Oconnor Umangamoana Puia
 Allen Samani
 Chris Meqi Saru
 Felix Galo Solomon
 Ellison Junior Suri
 Simon Suiaimoana Tepuke
 Presley Naotago Teseu
 John Tipaika Tingiia
 Paul Joseph Junior Tovua
 Izzy Tuhakiu
 Masikwai Wale

Triathlon

Solomon Islands qualified six athletes in triathlon:

Men
 Jad Godfrey Nalo
 Rocky Donald Ratu
 Boris Teddy

Women
 Melisa Bereta
 Mary Marasina
 Andriana Tukuvia

Volleyball

Solomon Islands qualified  men's and women's volleyball teams (total of 27 players):

Men
 Tibao Amon
 Wilton Auga
 Christian Tentaku Bakeua
 George Boraing
 Jeremiah Amba Kakoi
 Davis Karotu
 Hamilton Kasi
 Francis Koria
 Douglas Ladomea
 Rolex Minu
 Hunter Kulienai Nuopula Jnr
 Rex Jamie Sade
 Emmanuel Tenai
 Carlvyn Rex Teno

Women
 Lindy Diau
 Hannah Uuna Donga
 Hilda Folanga
 Annie Olokwao James
 Minah Tonungenga Maitaki
 Nadya Hakatahia Nasiu
 Evalita Reuben
 Sogha Ken Reuben
 Evalita Ruben
 Corona Tanavalu
 Kaysie Paieke Tesua
 Dalcy Makane Vahoe
 Rossina Marama Vahoe

Weightlifting

Solomon Islands qualified eleven  athletes in weightlifting:

Men
 David Nickson Biolo
 David Gorosi
 Leslie Mae
 Albert Maeke
 Brown Chester Ramohaka
 Anthony Saru

Women
 Hepline Iro
 Arina Kalibiu
 Mary Kini Lifu
 Daisy Tolugu
 Jenly Tegu Wini

References

2015 in Solomon Islands sport
Nations at the 2015 Pacific Games
Solomon Islands at the Pacific Games